The Blob franchise consists of American science fiction monster-horror films, including the Steve McQueen-led original, its campy comedic sequel, and its remake. Based on an original story by Irving H. Millgate, the plot centers around the invasion of Earth by an amoeboidal creature from a different planet that emerges from a meteorite and feasts on anything that it comes into contact with. The story of each installment includes the resistance of the planet's inhabitants, and their attempts to thwart the monster's advances.

The 1958 original film was met initially with mixed critical reception, but was a financial successes at the box office making a large return for the studio despite its B-movie micro-sized production budget. Becoming more popular than the top-billed movie in its debut double feature release, The Blob (1958) has been deemed a horror classic of U.S. cinema, by modern day critics who cite its influence over contemporary movies. Its 1972 sequel was likewise met with mixed reception from critics, and ultimately lost money at the box office. In the years since, criticisms regarded the change of genre, its comedy style, and the inclusion of hippie plotlines calling it a "relic" of its time; while the cast and their performance were stated as being notable. The 1988 remake was also met with mixed reviews from critics, while being deemed a box office bomb upon its release. Despite these early reactions, the movie has gained a following of fans, and is often regarded as one of the greatest remakes in the history of horror films, earning its classification as a cult classic by modern film critics; some even considering it better than the original.

As of 2015, a reboot film was said to have been in development.

Films

The Blob (1958)

Beware! The Blob (1972)

The Blob (1988)

Future

In August 2009, it was announced that a reboot of the franchise was in development, with Rob Zombie serving as writer, director, and producer. The filmmaker stated that his adaptation would be different from the original, with a darker tone; stating that his "intention is not to have a big red blobby thing", and that it's "the first thing [he] want[ed] to change". The production was intended to be R-rated, with Zombie stating that it would primarily be a science fiction with horror elements. Richard Saperstein, Brian Witten, Jack H. Harris, Judith Parker Harris, and Andy Gould were announced as additional producers on the project. The project was announced to a joint-venture production between Dimension Films, and Worldwide Entertainment Corporation. Principal photography was scheduled to commence in spring of 2010, with a budget of $30 million total. Zombie later stepped down from the position however, citing creative differences and due to multiple delays. Carey W. Hayes and Chad Hayes wrote the next draft of the script during this time.

In January 2015, the project re-entered development with Simon West signed on as director. Richard Saperstein and Brian Witten will serve as producers, while producer of the original film, Jack H. Harris will serve as executive producer. The project will utilize CGI special effects to portray the titular monster. Principal photography was tentatively scheduled for that summer. The project will be a joint-venture production between Goldcrest Films, Taewon Entertainment, and A-List Corporation; while Goldcrest will handle distribution. West classified the film as a science fiction monster movie featuring alien invasion which will explore the extra terrestrial in greater detail, stating that it will be similar to Alien and Predator. By May 2021, following various degrees of development hell, the project was delayed once more with producers citing the COVID-19 pandemic as one of the reasons. Despite this, the producers filed a lawsuit stating that the coronavirus extends their contract deadline to continue retaining the film rights.

Main cast and characters

Additional crew and production details

Reception

Box office and financial performance

Critical and public response

In other media

Other films

The titular monster from another planet also featured in various other films, namely a number of 3D-styled animated monster-family comedies. Dreamworks Animation movie, Monsters vs. Aliens (2009) includes characters inspired by various '50s "creature" films, while the Sony Pictures Animation Hotel Transylvania franchise, includes incarnations of various Universal Classic Monsters in addition to monsters from other  franchises and studios.

Events

A yearly event called Blobfest is held in Phoenixville, Pennsylvania at the Colonial Theatre, since 1999 as scenes for the film were filmed there, as well as surrounding cities and at the theater. The events celebrate the town's portrayal and appearance in The Blob films, and include: 1950s live music, skit performances,cosplaying by attendees encouraged to dress as characters from the films as well as in the style of the time period, food and drink vendors, souvenir memorabilia, and a reenactment of the "run out" scene featured in the film.

Legacy

Analysis
In 1997, film historians named Kim R. Holston and Tom Winchester were quoted as noting that The Blob (1958) was a "very famous piece of pop culture is a model of a decent movie on a small budget".

Additionally, the film is recognized by American Film Institute in the following lists:
 2001: AFI's 100 Years...100 Thrills – Nominated
 2003: AFI's 100 Years...100 Heroes & Villains - The 50 Greatest Heros & 50 Greatest Villains: "The Blob" – #30 Nominated Villain

Influence
In computing, a Binary large object or "blob" is classified as a collection of binary data stored as a single file. These "blobs" typically consist of images, audio, other multimedia objects, or a combination of these items. Additionally, sometimes executable code is stored as a "blob". Binary large objects originally were originally non-descript large accumulations of data invented by Jim Starkey at the Digital Equipment Corporation. Starkey later described their function jokingly as "the thing that ate Cincinnati, Cleveland, or whatever...[from] the 1958 Steve McQueen movie", acknowledging that their term refers to The Blob.

References 

 
Horror film series
Film series introduced in 1958